The 1990 British Grand Prix was a Formula One motor race held at Silverstone on 15 July 1990. It was the eighth race of the 1990 Formula One World Championship. It was the 45th British Grand Prix and the 26th to be held at Silverstone, which was the fastest circuit on the F1 calendar at the time.

The race was won by Frenchman Alain Prost, driving a Ferrari. Prost's teammate, local hero Nigel Mansell, took pole position and led before retiring with a gearbox failure nine laps from the end. Belgian Thierry Boutsen finished second in a Williams-Renault, with Brazilian Ayrton Senna third in a McLaren-Honda.

The win, Prost's third in succession and fourth of the season, gave him the lead of the Drivers' Championship, two points ahead of Senna.

Qualifying

Pre-qualifying report
In Friday morning pre-qualifying, the Larrousse-Lolas were again first and second, their fifth 1–2 of the season, with Éric Bernard nearly a second faster than team-mate Aguri Suzuki. As at the previous Grand Prix in France, third fastest was Gabriele Tarquini in the AGS. This time, the fourth pre-qualifying spot went to Olivier Grouillard in the sole Osella.

These four were comfortably faster than the other runners, the fastest of which was Robert Moreno in a revised EuroBrun in fifth place. Sixth was Yannick Dalmas in the other AGS, his sixth failure to pre-qualify so far this season. Claudio Langes was seventh in the other, unrevised EuroBrun, with Bertrand Gachot a distant eighth in the Coloni after its engine destroyed itself yet again. Subaru ended their involvement with the Coloni team after this Grand Prix, with eight consecutive failures to pre-qualify, and the team were to source new engines for the next race in Germany. The Life team had no pit garage in which to prepare their car, and worked on the grass near the pits. Their car, still driven by Bruno Giacomelli, suffered an electrical failure after five laps, and was bottom of the time sheets again. Team manager Sergio Barbasio announced that they would stick with the hopeless in-house W12 engine, citing a lack of time to prepare the chassis for the Judd CV engines purchased from Lotus. However, Italian sources claimed that Life had simply been unable to complete the purchase due to lack of funds.

Pre-qualifying classification

Qualifying report
Mansell qualified on pole more than half a second in front of Senna, at an average speed of 158 mph (252 km/h).

Qualifying classification

Race

Race report
Local hero Nigel Mansell led until his gearbox began to malfunction. He was overtaken (against team orders, and to Mansell's chagrin) by Alain Prost and remained in second until his gearbox failed completely on lap 57. After retiring from the race Mansell famously threw his gloves into the crowd and announced he would retire from Formula One at the end of the season, a decision he later reversed.

Riccardo Patrese became the first driver ever to start 200 Grands Prix. On race day, he retired after damage was sustained in a collision with the Benetton of Alessandro Nannini on lap 27, whilst his team-mate Thierry Boutsen reached the podium and finished second.

Éric Bernard and Aguri Suzuki both scored the best results of their career up to this point. For Suzuki, it was the first points scoring finish of his career.

Ivan Capelli was the charger in the race. Starting 10th he spun early to avoid the collision between Patrese and Alessandro Nannini. Then racing with a broken exhaust header he charged hard, eventually passing Gerhard Berger for 3rd and for a time being the fastest driver on the track before retiring on lap 48 with a fuel leak.

Ligier needed at least a top eight finish to avoid pre-qualification, but Nicola Larini could not do better than 10th place, while teammate Philippe Alliot only managed to finish 13th.

This would be the last motor race on the original high-speed Silverstone circuit; the day after the race, a construction crew funded by Tom Walkinshaw immediately began work on reprofiling and incorporating the newly designed corners.

Race classification

Championship standings after the race

Drivers' Championship standings

Constructors' Championship standings

References

British Grand Prix
British Grand Prix
Grand Prix
British Grand Prix